Kerkyra FC, also known as AO Kerkyra, the Athletic Club Kerkyra, is a Greek association football club based on the island of Kerkyra (Corfu), Greece.

History
It was formed in 1967 as "Kerkyraikos F.C." following a merge of three Corfu clubs ("Aris Kerkyras" est 1924, "Helespontos" est 1923 and "Asteras Kerkyras" est 1926). These three teams alongside "Olympos Kerkyras" were dominating Corfu Local Championship before the creation of Greek National Leagues in 1967. In order to represent Corfu in the National B' Class League the three teams decided to merge in 1967. Due to some players' dispute with "Olympos Kerkiras" in 1968 the team had to change its name to "A.O. Kerkyra".

Colors, emblem and ground
The club's colors are Maroon and Blue, depicting the colors of the island and its emblem is the ancient Corfiot's ("Faiakes") trireme, which is the island's emblem. The National stadium of the town of Corfu, "E.A.K.K.", (built in 1955) hosts A.O. Kerkyra since its foundation.

Golden age
After 36 years in lower divisions A.O. Kerkyra managed to reach top-level "Alpha Ethniki"  in 2004. The long effort to success was inspired by chairman Spyros Kalogiannis who took control in 1999 and managed to climb three divisions in 4 years. Though the long-awaited "Alpha Ethniki" didn't end up as expected as the club was relegated, taking the last place in the final table.
After a successful year in B' Ethniki, 2005–06 season ended with Kerkyra celebrating another chance in Alpha Ethniki.
2006-2007 was another failure in Alpha Ethniki or Super League Greece, with Kerkyra fighting bravely against relegation, but ending up relegated after a 2–2 tie on the last match against Panathinaikos FC. In the 2009–2010 season in Beta Ethniki they secured promotion to the super league on 2 May 2010 with a 0–0 draw against Panetolikos. The next years were the best for the Corfiot team managing to remain at Alpha Ethniki for three consecutive years.

Seven years of inactivity
In 2012–2013 season A.O. Kerkyra was relegated (16th place) to Beta Ethniki. 
At the same time another team from the island of Corfu, A.O. Kassiopi was promoted from third tier to Beta Ethniki and proposals for a merge were made. The, so called, merge, amidst protests from fans and veteran players deemed necessary that A.O. Kerkyra would cease to exist and that A.O. Kassiopi would be renamed to "Kerkyra". Efforts to revive the club even at Amateur level never fruited and the club's administration was controlled by the shareholders of A.O. Kassiopi.

Revival
In 2020 after 7 years of courtroom efforts A.O.Kerkyra was revived with a probate appointed administration, consisted of veteran players and fans. The team now participates in the A League of local amateur championship of EPS Kerkyras.

Fans
Their nickname is Vourligans, a portmanteau of Vourlismenos (crazy in corfiot dialect) and Hooligans.

Club Rivalries
A.O. Kerkyra's longest rivalry is with local club Olympos Kerkiras, though due to A.O. Kerkyra's high division presence, the two teams don't play often against each other. 
Kerkyra also have long rivalries with nearby Epirus clubs as PAS Giannina, Anagennisi Artas, Panetolikos and Tilikratis of Lefkada. The reason for the rivalry is that historically these clubs competed against each other in order to advance to higher leagues. PAS Giannina and Anagennisi Artas, especially, are from nearby Epirus and there is a historical and cultural, (usually friendly), rivalry between the islanders and their mainland neighbours that also extends to their respective football clubs and fans. Panetolikos is another mainland team from nearby Aetolia-Acarnania and the same rivalry logic applies as with the Epirus teams.

Kerkyra National Stadium
Built in 1961
Capacity of 2,685 (all seated)
Biggest Attendance 5,000 (AO Kerkyra v PAS Giannina 1974)
The stadium has two stands, the main one has a roof and is where the players and officials emerge from. The second stand is situated directly opposite and is a famous and very hostile terrace during big games. This is also where a lot of the Vourligans will watch from. This stand was constructed in 1973.

Current squad

Technical team

 Manager:  Giannis Xondrogiannis

Managers
 Nikos Pantelis (1996)
 Babis Tennes (2003)
 Nikos Anastopoulos (July 1, 2003 – Jan 11, 2005)
 Giorgos Foiros (Jan 25, 2005 – April 21, 2005)
 Babis Tennes (July 1, 2005 – Feb 12, 2008)
 Nikos Pantelis (Dec 1, 2008 – May 31, 2009)
 Babis Tennes (July 27, 2009 – Nov 30, 2010)
 Božidar Bandović (Nov 30, 2010 – Nov 9, 2011)
 Javi Gracia (Nov 14, 2011 – March 28, 2012)
 Timos Kavakas (March 28, 2012 – June 30, 2012)
 Apostolos Mantzios (July 1, 2012 – Feb 6, 2013)
 Giannis Papakostas (Feb 7, 2013 – April 29, 2013)
 Giannis Xondrogiannis (April 2020–)

Historic presidents

Dimosthenis Tsagaratos (1970)
Spiros Kalogiannis (2000–10)

AO Kerkyra season performances 1969 – present
1969–70: B' National A Group (11th)
1970–71: B' National A Group (17th)
1971–72: B' National A Group (14th)
1972–73: B' National A Group (16th
1973–74: B' National A Group (14th)
1974–75: B' National A Group (20th; Relegation)
1975–76: After the fall of the Second national, AOK is in the First Division of the Football Association of Corfu
1976–77: A' Division of F.A. Corfu
1977–84: A' Division of F.A. Corfu
1984–85: C' National South Group (14th)
1985–86: C' National South Group (11th)
1986–87: C' National South Group (12th)
1987–88: C' National South Group (12th; Relegation)
1988–89: D' National (4th; Promotion)
1989–90: C' National South Group (16th; Relegation)
1990–91: D' National (3rd)
1991–92: D' National (1st; Promotion) - Finalist in Greek Amateur Cup
1992–93: C' National South Group (14th; Relegation)
1993–94: D' National (7th)
1994–95: D' National (3rd)
1995–96: D' National (1st; Promotion)
1996–97: C' National South Group (9th)
1997–98: C' National South Group (12th; Relegation)
1998–99: D' National (5th)
1999–00: D' National (3rd)
2000–01: D' National (1st; Promotion)
2001–02: C' National (1st; Promotion)
2002–03: B' National (5th)
2003–04: B' National (1st; Historical Promotion to A' National)
2004–05: A' National (16th; Relegation)
2005–06: B' National (2nd; Promotion)
2006–07: Super League (14th; Relegation)
2007–08: B' National (7th)
2008–09: B' National (5th)
2009–10: B' National (2nd; Promotion)
2010–11: Super League (12th)
2011–12: Super League (13th)
2012–13: Super League (16th; Relegation)
2020–21: EPS Kerkyra A' Class (The season was abandoned after 3rd round)
2021–22: EPS Kerkyra A' Class (2nd; Promotion after Play-off)

Note: A' National = Super League, B' National = Football League, C' National = Gamma Ethniki

References

External links
 Official Website

 
Football clubs in the Ionian Islands (region)
Corfu (city)
Association football clubs established in 1968
1968 establishments in Greece